Edmund Andrzej Fetting (10 November 1927, in Warsaw, Poland – 30 January 2001 there) was a Polish film and theatrical actor and occasional singer.

Fetting was awarded the Knight's Cross of the Order of Polonia Restituta (1980) and the Gold Cross of Merit (1974).

Partial filmography

 Nikodem Dyzma (1956) - Guest
 Wolne miasto (1958) - German with Photo Aparat (uncredited)
 Miejsce na ziemi (1960) - Thief (uncredited)
 Samson (1961) - Guest at Lucyna's Party
 All Souls' Day (1961) - Michal
 Daleka jest droga (1963)
 Zbrodniarz i panna (1963) - Lt. Kaplinski
 Prawo i pięść (1964) - lead song
 Zycie raz jeszcze (1965) - Editor Rydz
 Glos ma prokurator (1965) - prosecutor Andrzej Tabor
 The Ashes (1965) - Austrian Official
 Katastrofa (1966) - Rowicki
 Lenin in Poland (1966) - Honecki
 Znicz olimpijski (1970) - Gestapo chief
 Ostatni swiadek (1970) - Klaus Goltz
 Lokis (1970) - Pastor
 Brylanty pani Zuzy (1972) - Krzysztof / Gang Boss
 Jak daleko stad, jak blisko (1972) - Szymon
 Die Elixiere des Teufels (1973, DEFA) - Judge
 Zazdrosc i medycyna (1973) - Dr. Willi von Fuchs
 In Desert and Wilderness (1973) - Mr Georg Rawlison
 Zaczarowane podwórko (1974)
 Gniazdo (1974) - Krystian, Dubrawa's brother
 Death of a President (1977) - General Józef Haller
 Sprawa Gorgonowej (1977) - Inspector Piatkiewicz
 Tanczacy jastrzab (1977)
 Pasja (1978) - Zajaczkowski
 Inquest of Pilot Pirx (1979) - Oskarzyciel przed trybunalem
 Droga daleka przed nami... (1980)
 Ojciec królowej (1980) - Austrian Ambassador
 Dzien Wisly (1980) - Professor
 Polonia Restituta (1981) - David Lloyd George
 Glosy (1981) - Psychiatrist Meller
 Nad Niemnem (1987) - Darzecki

External links
 

Polish male actors
1927 births
2001 deaths
Burials at Powązki Cemetery
Polish LGBT singers
Polish LGBT actors
Knights of the Order of Polonia Restituta
Recipients of the Gold Cross of Merit (Poland)
20th-century Polish  male singers